Jidenna Theodore Mobisson (born May 4, 1985), known mononymously as Jidenna, is an American rapper and singer. In 2015, Jidenna released two singles, "Classic Man" (featuring Roman GianArthur and Kendrick Lamar) and "Yoga" (with Janelle Monáe), promoting Monáe's label Wondaland Records' compilation EP, The Eephus (2015) with Epic Records. His debut album, The Chief, was released on February 17, 2017, and peaked at number 38 on the Billboard 200.

Early life and education 
Jidenna Theodore Mobisson was born on May 4, 1985, in Wisconsin Rapids, Wisconsin,  to Tama Mobisson, an accountant, and Oliver Mobisson, a Nigerian Igbo academic. Mobisson grew up partially in Nigeria, where his father was working as a professor of computer science at Enugu State University. When Mobisson was six years old, the family moved back to the United States. In 1995, the family moved to Norwood, Massachusetts, and then to Milton in 2000. His father died in 2010.

In high school he became a co-founder of the rap group Black Spadez, and began producing, arranging and writing. Mobisson released his first album with Black Spadez as their final project at Milton Academy, where Mobisson graduated in 2003. In 2008, after graduating with a Bachelor of Arts degree in Comparative Studies in Race and Ethnicity from Stanford University, he pursued his music career while working full-time as a teacher, moving between Los Angeles, Oakland, Brooklyn and Atlanta, before signing a deal with recording artist Janelle Monáe's Wondaland Records.

Career 

Jidenna is signed to Janelle Monáe's Wondaland Records label and distributed through Epic Records. He has collaborated with a number of artists that are signed to this label; including Roman GianArthur, St. Beauty, Deep Cotton and Janelle Monáe herself, and then began recording a five-song compilation of its label's first extended play (EP), titled The Eephus. In February 2015, Jidenna released his first official single, called "Classic Man" featuring GianArthur. The song was in heavy rotation throughout the United States, and debuted at number 49 on Billboard Hot R&B/Hip-Hop Airplay chart.

On March 31, 2015, the second single from the EP was released – "Yoga" by Janelle Monáe and Jidenna. His song "Classic Man" was nominated for Best Rap/Sung Collaboration at the 58th Grammy Awards. In June of the same year, Jidenna performed the song with Monáe at the BET Awards. Jidenna also received an award for best new artist at the 2015 Soul Train Music Awards in November.

Jidenna is a founding member of Fear & Fancy, a social club that began in California in 2006. The society, reminiscent of the social aid and pleasure clubs of New Orleans, is an international collective of entrepreneurs, activists, educators, scientists, and artists who host soirees, dinner parties, and demonstrations.

In June 2016 he released the single "Chief Don't Run". On February 17, 2017, Jidenna released The Chief, his first studio album. The album cover pays homage to Boz Scaggs' Middle Man album. The lead singles "Sufi Woman" and "Tribe" were released on July 26, 2019, and will appear on his second studio album 85 to Africa.

In 2019 Jidenna released his second album, 85 to Africa.

Style 
Jidenna stated that his major influences include KRS-One and Big Daddy Kane, as well as the Nigerian Highlife music genre.

Over the years, the singer developed his personal style in college, where he learned about the power of fashion from his psychology professor Philip Zimbardo. However, he would not adopt his signature dandy style until the death of his father in 2010. Jidenna describes his look as "heavily inspired by the Harlem Renaissance with hints of traditional West African design," and a "marriage of European and African aesthetics." Jidenna currently resides in East Flatbush, Brooklyn.

Appearances in popular media 

In September 2016, Jidenna was featured in an episode of the Netflix original series Luke Cage. Season 1 episode 5, "Just to Get a Rep", opens with Jidenna performing "Long Live the Chief" at the fictitious Harlem's Paradise. He performed "Long Live the Chief" and "Little Bit More" with a full band on The Daily Show with Trevor Noah in October 2016. Jidenna guest starred on Insecure in the episodes "Thirsty as Fuck," and "Shady as Fuck," which aired in November 2016.

A chopped and screwed version of "Classic Man" featured in the Academy Award winning 2016 film Moonlight.

Discography 

Wondaland Presents: The Eephus (2015)
The Chief (2017)
Boomerang – EP (2017)
 85 to Africa (2019)

Awards and nominations

Grammy Awards 

|-
| 2016
| "Classic Man" (featuring Roman GianArthur)
| Best Rap/Sung Collaboration
| 
|-

|}

ASFA Awards 

|-
| 2016
| Crossing Boarders with Fashion
| Continental (Africa)
| 
|-

|}

Soul Train Music Awards 

|-
| rowspan="4"|2015
| Himself
| Best New Artist
| 
|-
| rowspan="2"|"Classic Man" (featuring Roman GianArthur)
| Song of the Year
| 
|-
| Video of the Year
| 
|-
| "Yoga" (with Janelle Monáe)
| Best Dance Performance
| 
|-
|}

References

External links 

 

Epic Records artists
Living people
Stanford University alumni
1985 births
Milton Academy alumni
Singers from Wisconsin
People from Wisconsin Rapids, Wisconsin
American people of Igbo descent
American contemporary R&B singers
21st-century American singers
21st-century American male singers
Pop rappers
American male pop singers